Baron Jeffreys is a title that has been created twice, once in the Peerage of England and once in the Peerage of the United Kingdom. The first creation came in the Peerage of England on 16 May 1685 when the lawyer and later Lord Chancellor, Sir George Jeffreys, 1st Baronet, was made Baron Jeffreys, of Wem. He had already been created a Baronet, of Bulstrode in the County of Buckingham, in the Baronetage of England in 1681. The titles became extinct on the death of his son, the second Baron, in 1702, who had no male heir: his daughter, the writer Henrietta Fermor, married the 1st Earl of Pomfret. The estates passed to Jeffreys' widow, Lady Charlotte Herbert, who later remarried as Viscountess Windsor.

The next creation came in the Peerage of the United Kingdom in 1952 when General George Jeffreys was made Baron Jeffreys, of Burkham in the County of Southampton. He had also served as Conservative Member of Parliament for Petersfield. Jeffreys' father Arthur Frederick Jeffreys had previously represented Basingstoke in Parliament, and had been admitted to the Privy Council in 1902. Lord Jeffreys was succeeded by his grandson, the second Baron, his son and heir Captain Christopher John Darell Jeffreys (1907–1940) having been killed in action in May 1940.  the title is held by the second Baron's eldest son, the third Baron, who succeeded in 1986.

The family seat is Bottom Farm, near Grantham, Lincolnshire.

Baron Jeffreys, first creation (1685)
George Jeffreys, 1st Baron Jeffreys (1645–1689)
John Jeffreys, 2nd Baron Jeffreys (1673–1702)

Baron Jeffreys, second creation (1952)
George Darell Jeffreys, 1st Baron Jeffreys (1878–1960)
Mark George Christopher Jeffreys, 2nd Baron Jeffreys (1932–1986)
Christopher Henry Mark Jeffreys, 3rd Baron Jeffreys (born 1957)

The heir apparent is the present holder's son, the Hon. Arthur Mark Henry Jeffreys (born 1989).

Line of succession

  General George Darell Jeffreys, 1st Baron Jeffreys (1878–1960)
 Captain Christopher John Darell Jeffreys (1907–1940)
  Mark George Christopher Jeffreys, 2nd Baron Jeffreys (1932–1986)
  Christopher Henry Mark Jeffreys, 3rd Baron Jeffreys (born 1957)
 (1) Hon. Arthur Mark Henry Jeffreys (born 1989)
 (2) Hon. Alexander Charles Darell Jeffreys (born 1959)
 Hon. George Christian Darell Jeffreys (1939–2010)
 (3) Christopher George Hugo Jeffreys (born 1984)

Coat of arms

Male-line family tree

References

Kidd, Charles, Williamson, David (editors). Debrett's Peerage and Baronetage (1990 edition). New York: St Martin's Press, 1990.

1685 establishments in England
Extinct baronies in the Peerage of England
Baronies in the Peerage of the United Kingdom
Noble titles created in 1685
Noble titles created in 1952
Noble titles created for UK MPs
1952 establishments in the United Kingdom